Panau quarlesi is a moth in the family Cossidae. It was described by Roepke in 1957. It is found on Borneo. The habitat consists of lowland rain forests.

References

Natural History Museum Lepidoptera generic names catalog

Zeuzerinae
Moths described in 1957